During the 2003–04 English football season, Millwall competed in the Football League First Division, the second tier of English football.

Season summary
Despite having spent the previous seasons chasing promotion to the Premiership, Mark McGhee left Millwall by "mutual consent" in October with the club just six points behind league leaders Sheffield United with 14 games played. His replacement, player-manager Dennis Wise, led Millwall to a final 10th place, four points off the play-offs. The club enjoyed greater success in the FA Cup, reaching the final for the first time in their history, to face Manchester United. Millwall, who were missing 16 players through injury and suspension, were unable to create many opportunities and lost 3-0 to a United side which had finished third in the Premier League that season.

Curtis Weston, a boyhood United fan, became the youngest player to ever appear in an FA Cup final when he came on a substitute for Wise in the 89th minute. Weston, aged 17 years 119 days, beat the 125-year-old record previously held by James F. M. Prinsep, who appeared in the 1879 final for Clapham Rovers aged 17 years and 245 days; Weston defeated Prinsep's record by 126 days.

As United had already qualified for the Champions League, Millwall gained European qualification for the first time in their history, entering the UEFA Cup in the first round.

Final league table

Kit
Strikeforce remained Millwall's kit sponsors. London-based stationery retailer Ryman became kit sponsors.

Players

First-team squad
Squad at end of season

Left club during season

Reserve squad

Awards
At the end of the season, defender Darren Ward was named the club's player of the year.

Notes

References

External links
Official Website
Sky Sports
BBC Football

2003-04
Millwall